Jonathan Ball (born January 6, 1985) is a Bermudian football player, who currently plays for PHC Zebras.

Club career
Ball has been part of the Bermuda Hogges squad in the USL Second Division since 2008.

In November 2013, Ball was voted PHC Zebras' president while confirming he would carry on playing for the club.

International career
He made his debut for Bermuda in a December 2007 friendly match against Saint Kitts & Nevis and earned a total of 4 caps, scoring no goals.

His final international match was a June 2008 friendly against Barbados.

References

External links

1985 births
Living people
Bermudian footballers
Bermuda international footballers
PHC Zebras players
Bermuda Hogges F.C. players
USL Second Division players
Association football defenders